The Soaring Society of America (SSA) was founded at the instigation of Warren E. Eaton to promote the sport of soaring in the USA and internationally. The first meeting was held in New York City in the McGraw–Hill Building on February 20, 1932. Its first objective was to hold a national soaring competition every year, but other roles were quickly adopted.  In 1954, the Society created the Soaring Hall of Fame. Today the SSA, with a nationwide membership of over 10,000, is headquartered in Hobbs, New Mexico.  It is a 501(c)(3) charity organization.

The SSA is led by the 17 members on its board of directors and its executive committee, ten of whom are regionally elected by the general membership and serve for three years.  The other seven at-large directors are elected annually by the other directors. In addition to the executive meetings of the board, full SSA Board meetings are held twice a year and are open to the general membership.  A support staff administers the daily business of the society from the headquarters offices.

The main responsibilities of the SSA are:
 Flight training and safety
 Technological research and development
 Services to members, such as organising SSA conventions and verifying badge claims
 Sponsorship and monitoring of competitions
 Promoting the sport and contact with the media
 Representing members' interests at meetings with Federal agencies in matters such as airspace
 Publishing Soaring magazine

See also
Richard C. du Pont Memorial Trophy

External links
Soaring Society of America
Soaring Hall of Fame at the National Soaring Museum
Soaring Safety Foundation

Sports governing bodies in the United States
Gliding in the United States
Gliding associations